Ferdinand of Habsburg or Ferdinand Habsburg may refer to:

 Ferdinand I, Holy Roman Emperor (1503–1564)
 Ferdinand II, Holy Roman Emperor (1578–1637)
 Ferdinand III, Holy Roman Emperor (1608–1657)
 Ferdinand I of Austria (1793–1875)
 Ferdinand Habsburg (racing driver) (born 1997)

See also
Ferdinand Habsburg (racing driver)
Ferdinand of Austria (disambiguation)